Stuart Arthur Ritchie (born 20 May 1968) is an English retired footballer, and was the manager of Havant & Waterlooville. He became manager in May 2012 after eight years managing AFC Totton. He played as a centre midfielder.

Career
Ritchie started his footballing career at Aston Villa where he made one substitute appearance for the club against Manchester United at the age of 19. He then signed for Crewe Alexandra without making any first team appearances before moving onto Waterford United and then into the English Non League system, playing for Bashley, Havant & Waterlooville and AFC Totton. Ritchie joined Totton as a player before being appointed as player-manager and then retiring from playing and becoming the club's full-time manager.

Managerial career

AFC Totton
Appointed as AFC Totton manager in 2004, he oversaw the club's rise from Wessex League to Southern League Premier Division (losing play-off finalists in 2011-12) and runners up in the FA Vase in 2007.

Havant & Waterlooville
On 8 May 2012, Havant & Waterlooville appointed Ritchie as manager and Sean New as his assistant. Ritchie played 53 games for the Hawks in their first two seasons as a combined club (1998-2000).
After just four months in charge, Ritchie was sacked leaving the side third bottom in the table.

References

1968 births
Living people
English footballers
Aston Villa F.C. players
English Football League players
Crewe Alexandra F.C. players
Havant & Waterlooville F.C. players
Waterford F.C. players
Bashley F.C. players
A.F.C. Totton players
A.F.C. Totton managers
Havant & Waterlooville F.C. managers
Association football midfielders
English football managers